The 1st White Cloth Hall is a Grade II* listed building on Kirkgate, in the city centre of Leeds in West Yorkshire, England.

History

Originally named The White Cloth Hall, it was opened in 1711 as a response to the building of a covered cloth hall by the merchants of Wakefield in 1710, built in order to entice traders away from Leeds. So the cloth hall for the sale of white (undyed) cloth was built on Kirkgate on a site provided by Lord Irvine of Temple Newsam with £1,000 given by merchants and tradesmen. It was 'built upon Pillars and Arches in the form of an Exchange, with a Quadrangular Court within'.

Present

Despite its importance to the industrial heritage of Leeds and to the industrial revolution in general, the first White Cloth Hall in Kirkgate has stood growing increasingly derelict for many years surrounded by scaffolding and safety hoardings. The Amusement Arcade in its eastern wing still operates but the rest of the building is getting close to state of collapse and is a health and safety hazard.

A series of meetings with the City Council Planning Officers, the building owner Emco, and English Heritage, concluded that the western and southern sections of the building must be demolished.

In March 2018, Leeds City Council granted Rushbond Group permission to restore the building. Rushbond Group are local property developers who bought the building over a year earlier. Work started in March 2019.

In 2019 Historic England commissioned dendrochronological (tree-ring) analysis on ex situ samples from 19 oak and one conifer timbers from the former west range of First White Cloth Hall. This analysis dated the timber as growing during the years AD 1366–1476, with the trees felled in the summer of AD 1476, with a likelihood that the timbers were part of a specific programme of felling and construction from a single woodland source relatively local to West Yorkshire. This date is earlier than had been expected based on the opening of First White Cloth Hall in the early eighteenth century.

See also
2nd White Cloth Hall
3rd White Cloth Hall
4th White Cloth Hall

References

External links

Listed buildings in Leeds
Grade II* listed buildings in West Yorkshire
Buildings and structures in Leeds
Commercial buildings completed in 1711
1711 establishments in England